Andrei Aleksandrovich Chibisov (born 26 February 1993) is a Russian professional ice hockey player for Metallurg Magnitogorsk of the Kontinental Hockey League (KHL).

Playing career
Undrafted, he played in the Kontinental Hockey League for HC Yugra, Ak Bars Kazan and Metallurg Magnitogorsk. On June 2, 2019. Chibisov agreed to a contract in North America, signing a one-year, entry-level contract with the Winnipeg Jets.

After attending his first training camp in North America, Chibisov was assigned by the Jets to begin the 2019–20 season with American Hockey League affiliate, the Manitoba Moose. He remained with the Moose for the majority of the season, contributing with 7 goals and 25 points in 50 games. He was recalled by the Jets on two occasions, featuring in 2 NHL games, going scoreless.

With the AHL season prematurely ended due to the COVID-19 pandemic and left off the Jets Return to Play roster, Chibisov as a free agent returned to his native Russia, rejoining former club Metallurg Magnitogorsk on a three-year contract on 4 August 2020.

International play

On 23 January 2022, Chibisov was named to the roster to represent Russian Olympic Committee athletes at the 2022 Winter Olympics.

Career statistics

Regular season and playoffs

International

References

External links

1993 births
Living people
Ak Bars Kazan players
Manitoba Moose players
Metallurg Magnitogorsk players
Rubin Tyumen players
Russian ice hockey right wingers
Undrafted National Hockey League players
Winnipeg Jets players
HC Yugra players
Ice hockey players at the 2022 Winter Olympics
Medalists at the 2022 Winter Olympics
Olympic silver medalists for the Russian Olympic Committee athletes
Olympic medalists in ice hockey
Olympic ice hockey players of Russia
People from Prokopyevsk
Sportspeople from Kemerovo Oblast